Oklahoma City Assembly was a General Motors automobile factory in Oklahoma City, Oklahoma.

History 
Construction on the  plant started in 1974, and it opened in 1979 to produce the newly designed X-body cars for the 1980 model year. After X-body cars came A-body cars (1985-1996) and then the plant began producing the Oldsmobile Cutlass through 1999 and Chevrolet Malibu through 2001.  The company spent $700,000,000 to convert the plant from building the Chevrolet Malibu to building the all-new GMT360 SUVs (Chevrolet TrailBlazer, GMC Envoy, Oldsmobile Bravada) in 2001 for the 2002 model year. The plant was damaged by a tornado on May 8, 2003, but the company repaired the damage and returned the plant to operations just 53 days later.

On December 6, 2005, General Motors alerted the United Auto Workers local 1999 that the plant would be closed in February 2006 as part of cost-saving measures. The last vehicle produced at the plant, a white Chevrolet TrailBlazer EXT, rolled out on February 20, 2006. The Oklahoma City Assembly plant was the first of 12 GM manufacturing plants that GM planned to permanently close by 2008, to match production with market demand. An estimated 521,400 GMT360 trucks were built at the Oklahoma City Assembly plant.

The Oklahoma City plant employed 2,400 people — 2,200 hourly and 200 salaried — but economists estimated that as many as 7,500 jobs in the area could be affected, including those at GM suppliers and secondary jobs, like hotel and restaurant workers.

Laid-off employees had the option of retiring or enrolling in GM's Jobs Bank, which allows workers to collect full pay and benefits as they attend classes or volunteer at community agencies. Some workers would continue to be paid through September 2007, when GM's UAW contract expired.

On May 13, 2008, the voters of Oklahoma County approved the purchase of the plant, which was to be leased to neighboring Tinker Air Force Base, which borders the north side of the plant.

Products
 2004–2005 GMC Envoy XUV
 2003–2006 Isuzu Ascender extended length
 2002–2006 Chevrolet TrailBlazer EXT
 2002–2006 GMC Envoy XL
 1997–2001 Chevrolet Malibu
 1997–1999 Oldsmobile Cutlass
 1989–1996 Oldsmobile Cutlass Ciera
 1988–1991 Pontiac 6000
 1982–1996 Buick Century
 1982–1989 Chevrolet Celebrity
 1980–1983 Chevrolet Citation
 1980–1982 Pontiac Phoenix

References 

General Motors factories
Former motor vehicle assembly plants
Economy of Oklahoma City
Motor vehicle assembly plants in Oklahoma
Industrial buildings completed in 1979
2006 disestablishments in Oklahoma
1979 establishments in Oklahoma
Defunct manufacturing companies based in Oklahoma